In theoretical computer science, the continuous knapsack problem (also known as the fractional knapsack problem) is an algorithmic problem in combinatorial optimization in which the goal is to fill a container (the "knapsack") with fractional amounts of different materials chosen to maximize the value of the selected materials. It resembles the classic knapsack problem, in which the items to be placed in the container are indivisible; however, the continuous knapsack problem may be solved in polynomial time whereas the classic knapsack problem is NP-hard.  It is a classic example of how a seemingly small change in the formulation of a problem can have a large impact on its computational complexity.

Problem definition
An instance of either the continuous or classic knapsack problems may be specified by the numerical capacity  of the knapsack, together with a collection of materials, each of which has two numbers associated with it: the weight  of material that is available to be selected and the total value  of that material. The goal is to choose an amount  of each material, subject to the capacity constraint

and maximizing the total benefit

Some formulations of this problem rescale the variables  to be in the range from 0 to 1. In this case the capacity constraint becomes

and the goal is to maximize the total benefit

Solution technique
The continuous knapsack problem may be solved by a greedy algorithm, first published in 1957 by George Dantzig, that considers the materials in sorted order by their values per unit weight. For each material, the amount xi is chosen to be as large as possible:
If the sum of the choices made so far equals the capacity W, then the algorithm sets xi = 0.
If the difference d between the sum of the choices made so far and W is smaller than wi, then the algorithm sets xi = d.
In the remaining case, the algorithm chooses xi = wi.
Because of the need to sort the materials, this algorithm takes time O(n log n) on inputs with n materials. However, by adapting an algorithm for finding weighted medians, it is possible to solve the problem in time O(n).

References

Combinatorial optimization